WKEA-FM (98.3 FM, "98.3 Wild Country") is a radio station licensed to serve the community of Scottsboro, Alabama, United States. The station is owned by Southern Torch Media, Inc.

WKEA-FM broadcasts a country music format including programming from Jones Radio Network and Fox News Radio.

History
Radio station WCNA-FM was founded in 1965 by Dr. Ralph Sheppard, a local dentist and owner of the Jackson County Advertiser, a weekly newspaper.  The first FM radio station in Jackson County, Alabama, WCNA-FM began broadcasting a country music format on November 3, 1965. In 1971, Sheppard transferred the license to a company named Mellow Sound Broadcasting. The city of Scottsboro later honored Sheppard by declaring April 30, 2008, as "Dr. Ralph Sheppard Day" in honor of his many contributions to the community.

In July 1981, Mellow Sound Broadcasting, Inc., made a deal to sell this station to KEA Radio, Inc.  The deal was approved by the FCC on September 28, 1981. The new owners had the FCC assign new call letters WKEA-FM on October 1, 1981.

In late August 2013, the station debuted a translator (W289BV) on 105.7 MHz, relaying WKEA. In a curious move, despite being a simulcast, the translator has its own branding, as "Lake 105.7".

On August 19, 2019, WKEA rebranded as "98.3 Wild Country". The station became part of a landmark local radio deal in February 2019 when The Southern Torch newspaper and website companies made a deal to buy the KEA Radio properties, WKEA, and sister station WMXN-FM 101.7 to start Southern Torch Media, Inc. The purchase was consummated on April 1, 2019, at a price of $600,000.

Previous logo

References

The station was originally planned as an easy listening music station and the call letters WCNA-FM stood for, "We Cover North Alabama with Fine Music. One of the stations early DJ's, Doug Hodges, convinced the owner to change to a country format.

External links

KEA-FM
Country radio stations in the United States
Radio stations established in 1965
Jackson County, Alabama